Sadiq Usman Saleh (born 5 January 1970) also known as Sadiq Zazzabi is a Nigerian Hausa language singer, and songwriter. He became popular with his hit song Yanzu Abuja Tayi Tsaf. He won the first position award at Ga Fili Ga Mai Doki organized by Bayero University Kano.

Early life and background
Sadiq Zazzabi was born in Ayagi quarters, Gwale LGA, Kano State. He attended Warure Special Primary School in 1995, he moved to Adamu Nama’aji Junior Secondary School, he obtained his senior secondary certificate (SSCE) from Shekar-Barde Secondary School in 2002. He acquired a National Diploma in Environmental Studies and Survey from Federal College of Education, Kano.

Career
While growing up, Sadiq Zazzabi always like singing, he began by writing Islamic Songs for the Islamic School he attended. Sadiq started writing songs since 1997, the first song he wrote was Yar Gidan Ma’aiki (1997), Followed by Shugaban Halitta Sayyadil Kaunu (1997), Annabi Ne Madogara (1999). He joined Kannywood 2002, he gained recognition for his song Zazzabi which later become his stage name Sadiq Zazzabi in Kawa Zuci album (2005), he gained more exposure following the release of Yanzu Abuja Tayi Tsaf (2008). Sadiq he has written over 1000 songs which made him popular among hausa speakers across the country and beyond, his songs are based on love, politics and social issues among which includes Fyade (Rape) in which he addressed and enlighten the public the danger of menace of rape, and Babban Sarkin which he sang for the Emir of Zazzau Shehu Idris. He was arrested for the song Maza Bayan ka (All Men Behind You) in 2017.

Controversies
In March 2017, Sadiq was arrested and sued by Kano State Censors’ Board (KSCB) because of the song  Maza Bayan Ka (All Men Behind You), in which he expresses open support for former governor of Kano State Rabiu Musa Kwankwaso, a bitter political rival of the incumbent governor Abdullahi Umar Ganduje. Sadiq claim his arrest was Political, few days later he was released on bail.

Discography

Albums

Singles

References

1970 births
Nigerian male film actors
Hausa-language mass media
Living people
People from Kano
Male actors in Hausa cinema
21st-century Nigerian male actors
21st-century Nigerian male singers
20th-century Nigerian male singers
Actors from Kano